Ilya Volkov (Romanized: Ilya Volkov; , Romanized: Illia Volkaŭ; born 19 April 2002) is a Belarusian teen singer and part-time dancer.  He is best known for representing his country at the 11th annual Junior Eurovision Song Contest with his song Poy so Mnoy (Sing with me).

Life and career
Ilya Volkov was born on 19 April 2002 in Minsk, the capital city of Belarus.

Junior Eurovision Song Contest 2013

On 4 October 2013, Ilya Volkov went on to win the Belarusian selection for JESC with his song "Poy so Mnoy".  A few weeks later, Volkov shot a video for the song.  On 30 November 2013, he represented Belarus at the 11th Junior Eurovision Song Contest in Kyiv, Ukraine.  "Poy so Mnoy" placed third in a field of 12 songs with 108 points, receiving 12 points from Russia.

Discography

Singles

References

2002 births
Living people
21st-century Belarusian male singers
Belarusian pop singers
Junior Eurovision Song Contest entrants for Belarus
Belarusian child singers
Musicians from Minsk